Odala is a Palestinian town in the Nablus Governorate in northern West Bank, located south of Nablus. According to the Palestinian Central Bureau of Statistics (PCBS), the town had a population of 1,082 inhabitants in mid-year 2006.

Location
It is bordered by  Huwara to the west, Beita to the south and east, and ‘Awarta to the east and north.

History
Shards from  Hellenistic, Roman, Byzantine, Crusader, Ayyubid and Mamluk eras have been found here.

Ottoman era
Shards from the early  Ottoman  era have been found here. 
It had a population of 18 households and 2 bachelors, all Muslim. They paid a fixed tax-rate of 33,3 % on agricultural products, including wheat, barley,  summer crops,  olive trees, goats and beehives, in addition to occasional revenues and a press for olive oil or syrup; a total of 3,000 akçe. One quarter of  the revenue went to a Waqf.

In 1838,  Haudela  was noted as a village  in the District of El-Beitawy, east of Nablus.

In 1870 Victor Guérin noted  it as a village surrounded by olive and fig trees.

In 1882, the PEF's Survey of Western Palestine described Audelah as a small  hamlet, on the low hills east of the Mukhnah plain.

British Mandate era
In the 1922 census of Palestine, conducted by the British Mandate authorities, Audala had a population of 64 Muslims, increasing in the 1931 census  to 73 Muslim, in 17  houses. 

In the 1945 statistics  Odala  together with Awarta had a population of 1,470, all Muslims,  with 16,106   dunams of land, according to an official land and population survey. Of this, 30 dunams were plantations and irrigable land, 9,406  used for cereals, while 130 dunams were built-up land.

Jordanian era
In the wake of the 1948 Arab–Israeli War, and after the 1949 Armistice Agreements, Odala came  under Jordanian rule.

The Jordanian census of 1961 found 179 inhabitants.

1967-present
Since the Six-Day War in 1967,  Odala  has been under Israeli occupation. 

After the 1995 accords, 89%  of the village land is defined as Area B land, while the remaining 11% is defined as Area C.

In May, 2021, the Israeli army shot and killed 16 year old Said Yousef Mohammad Odeh from Odala. There were 
"confrontations" at the entrance at Odala at the time, but his family stated  that the  10-grader was not involved, while the Israeli army stated that he was. The  Defence for Children International - Palestine, stated: "Israeli forces reportedly confronted Palestinian youth at the village entrance prior to the shooting. Saeed was not involved in the confrontations at the time he was shot, according to information collected by our team.

"Israeli forces deployed in a nearby olive grove fired live ammunition at Saeed as he approached the village entrance. He sustained at least two gunshot wounds: in the back near his right shoulder and pelvis. Both bullets exited from the front." His cousin was shot at the same time, but survived.

References

Bibliography

External links
  Welcome To Udala
Survey of Western Palestine, Map 14:    IAA, Wikimedia commons 
Odala Village Profile,  Applied Research Institute–Jerusalem (ARIJ)
 Odala, aerial photo, (ARIJ)
 Development Priorities and Needs in Odala, (ARIJ)

Villages in the West Bank
Towns in Nablus Governorate
Municipalities of the State of Palestine